Artemis Records was a New York-based independent record label, founded in July 1999 by Danny Goldberg with Daniel Glass as President, and closed in April 2006. The label was acquired by E1 Entertainment.

Artemis had a leading share of the U.S. independent label market from 2001 to 2003. It released the last three albums of Warren Zevon's career including the Grammy-winning The Wind, five albums by Steve Earle including his Grammy winner The Revolution Starts Now, as well as gold albums by Kittie, Kurupt and Khia. Artemis also released the triple-platinum album Who Let the Dogs Out by the Baha Men, as well as albums by The Pretenders, Rickie Lee Jones Josh Joplin and Jimmie Vaughan.

As of 2006, Artemis Records was owned by Sheridan Square Entertainment LLC (SSE), an independent music company then based in New York. SSE's label group included Artemis Records, Artemis Classics, Vanguard Classics, Triloka Records, Tone-Cool Records, Ropeadope and Compendia (including Light Records). As well as those listed above, its artists included the Rosewood Thieves. SSE also owned the distribution company Musicrama.

In 2006 Richard Branson sold the North America division of his V2 Records label to SSE for $15 million. SSE then merged Artemis Records into V2 North America.

In 2009, the newly formed IndieBlu Music Holdings LLC acquired SSE's business, including V2 North America, in a UCC foreclosure auction.  IndieBlu was acquired by Entertainment One in 2010.

Artists

Johnny A.
Baha Men
Better Than Ezra
Every Move a Picture
Black Label Society
Boston
Cindy Bullens
Crossbreed
Dog Fashion Disco
Dope
Steve Earle
The Fabulous Thunderbirds
Flipp
The Fugs
Jeffrey Gaines
John Hiatt
Jaguar Wright
Rickie Lee Jones
Josh Joplin Group
Khia
Kittie
Kurupt
Little Barrie
Lisa Loeb
Lollipop Lust Kill
Murphy's Law
Alan Parsons
The Pretenders
Ruff Ryders
Todd Rundgren
Stephan Smith
Jill Sobule
Spacehog
Sugarcult
Jimmie Vaughan
Peter Wolf
Warren Zevon

References

External links
Official website: 

American independent record labels
Alternative rock record labels
Indie rock record labels
Record labels established in 1999
Record labels disestablished in 2006
1999 establishments in New York (state)
MNRK Music Group